This is a list of singles and albums released under Starship Entertainment. The entertainment company is home to prominent artists such as K. Will, Monsta X, Brother Su, WJSN, Cravity, and Ive, as well as formerly artists such as Sistar, Boyfriend, Junggigo, Mad Clown, and Jooyoung.

2008-2009

2010

2011

2012

2013

2014

2015

2016

2017

2018

2019

2020

2021

2022

2023

References

discography
Pop music discographies
Discographies of South Korean record labels